Vitrea gostelii is a species of small, air-breathing land snail, a terrestrial pulmonate gastropod mollusk in the family Pristilomatidae.

This species is endemic to Turkey.

References

Pristilomatidae